The Boulevard de Sébastopol is an important roadway in Paris, France, which serves to delimit the 1st and 2nd arrondissements from the 3rd and 4th arrondissements of the city.

The boulevard is 1.3 km in length, starting from the place du Châtelet and ends at the boulevard Saint-Denis, when it becomes the Boulevard de Strasbourg. The boulevard is a main thoroughfare, and consists of four vehicular lanes, one of which is reserved for buses.

Although the road is line with some shops and restaurants, its importance is that of a thoroughfare running north–south in central Paris. It separates Le Marais from Les Halles.

History  

The boulevard de Sébastopol is one of the most important roads opened up by the Baron Haussmann during his transformation of Paris in the 1850s. It was conceived as a major artery running a north–south axis across Paris, leading to the Gare de l'Est.

The road was christened Boulevard du Centre when it was opened in 1854. Following Napoléon III's victory at the port of Sevastopol, in the Crimea of 8 September 1855, it was given its current name.

 
For several years, the name belonged to the road known since 1867 as Boulevard Saint-Michel, along the Rive Gauche up to Rue Cujas.

Louis-Napoleon, when touring with Tsar Alexander II of Russia in 1867 during the Exposition Universelle (1867), had decided on Boulevard de Sébastopol as a perfectly peaceful area to bring the foreign guest through.  But Louis-Napoleon was disappointed, as shouts from crowds surrounding their vehicle could be heard, "Long live Poland!"

See also 
 
 Siege of Sevastopol (1854–1855)
 Boulevards of Paris

References

External links 
 Official nomenclature of Parisian roads 

Streets in the 1st arrondissement of Paris
Streets in the 2nd arrondissement of Paris
Streets in the 3rd arrondissement of Paris
Streets in the 4th arrondissement of Paris
Boulevards in Paris